Wallace Aaron Battle (1872 – 1946) was an educational leader for African Americans in the Southern United States. He grew up on a cotton farm in Alabama with the other 12 children of Augustus and Jeanetta (Redden) Battle, freed slaves. Battle graduated from Berea College, Berea, Ky. in 1901. He helped found Okolona College in 1902, also known as Okolona Industrial School, and Okolona Normal & Industrial School. The diary he kept provides a source for his life's work.

Early life and education 

Battle was educated at Talladega College, Talladega, Ala., 1889-98 and graduated from Berea College with a Master's Degree in 1909. He received a honorary doctorate from Berea College, in 1933.

Career 
Mr. Battle resigned from the presidency of the Okolona in 1927 to become Field Secretary of the American Church Institute of the Episcopal Church. In this position, among other duties, he assisted in supervising nine schools and colleges fostered by the Episcopal Church in eight Southern States.

Personal life 
Battle married Effie Dean Threat on Sept 9, 1903 and had four children.

References

1872 births
1946 deaths
Educators from Alabama
People from Okolona, Mississippi
Berea College alumni
African-American educators
University and college founders
20th-century African-American people